An orator, or oratist, is a public speaker, especially one who is eloquent or skilled.

Etymology
Recorded in English c. 1374, with a meaning of "one who pleads or argues for a cause", from Anglo-French oratour, Old French orateur (14th century), Latin orator ("speaker"), from orare ("speak before a court or assembly; plead"), derived from a Proto-Indo-European base *or- ("to pronounce a ritual formula").

The modern meaning of the word, "public speaker", is attested from c. 1430.

History
In ancient Rome, the art of speaking in public (Ars Oratoria) was a professional competence especially cultivated by politicians and lawyers. As the Greeks were still seen as the masters in this field, as in philosophy and most sciences, the leading Roman families often either sent their sons to study these things under a famous master in Greece (as was the case with the young Julius Caesar), or engaged a Greek teacher (under pay or as a slave).

In the young revolutionary French Republic, Orateur (French for "orator", but compare the Anglo-Saxon parliamentary speaker) was the formal title for the delegated members of the Tribunat to the Corps législatif, to motivate their ruling on a presented bill.

In the 19th century, orators and historians and speakers such as Mark Twain, Charles Dickens, and Col. Robert G. Ingersoll were major providers of popular entertainment.

A pulpit orator is a Christian author, often a clergyman, renowned for their ability to write or deliver (from the pulpit in church, hence the word) rhetorically skilled religious sermons.

In some universities, the title 'Orator' is given to the official whose task it is to give speeches on ceremonial occasions, such as the presentation of honorary degrees.

Orators 
The following is a list of those who have been noted as famous specifically for their oratory abilities, or for a particularly famous speech or speeches. Most religious leaders and politicians (by nature of their office) may give many speeches, as may those who support or oppose a particular issue. A list of all such leaders would be prohibitively long.

Classical era 
The ten Attic orators (Greece)
Demosthenes, champion of the Philippic
Aeschines
Andocides
Antiphon
Dinarchus
Hypereides
Lysias
Isaeus
Isocrates
Lycurgus of Athens
Aristogeiton
Claudius Aelianus, meliglossos, 'honey-tongued'
Cicero
Corax of Syracuse
Gaius Scribonius Curio, praetor urbanus in Roman Republic  BC  
Gorgias
Hegesippus, Athenian
Julius Caesar,  Roman dictator
Licinius Macer Calvus, Roman poet and orator
Marcus Antonius (orator), Roman
Pericles, Athenian statesman
Quintilian
Quintus Hortensius
John Chrysostom (literally golden-mouthed), Christian preacher

18th Century and later 
Allied leaders of World War II:
Winston Churchill (British Prime Minister)
Franklin D. Roosevelt (US President)
Charles de Gaulle (Free French general; later President of France)
Douglas MacArthur (US General of the Army) - Farewell Speech to Congress
Manuel L. Quezon (Philippine President)
Axis leaders of World War II:
Adolf Hitler (Führer of Nazi Germany)
Benito Mussolini (Il Duce of Fascist Italy)
Joseph Goebbels (Nazi Propaganda Minister)
 The U.S. 19th century Great Triumvirate:
Henry Clay
John C. Calhoun
Daniel Webster
Independence and civil rights leaders
Jawaharlal Nehru - Tryst with Destiny
William Jennings Bryan - Cross of Gold speech
Frederick Douglass - Self-Made Men
Patrick Henry - Give me Liberty, or give me Death!
Martin Luther King Jr. - I Have A Dream
Sojourner Truth - Ain't I a Woman?
Malcolm X - The Ballot or the Bullet
Nelson Mandela - I Am Prepared to Die
Presidents of the United States
Abraham Lincoln - Gettysburg Address
John F. Kennedy - Inaugural Address
Richard M. Nixon - Checkers speech (while Vice President)
Ronald Reagan - Mr. Gorbachev, tear down this wall!
Barack H. Obama - A More Perfect Union (speech)
Ralph Waldo Emerson - The American Scholar
Margaret Thatcher - The lady's not for turning
Rufus Choate
Robert G. Ingersoll
John Neal, first American orator on women's rights

Modern era 
Manuel Roxas
Hugo Chávez
Fidel Castro
Alan García
Ferdinand Marcos
Sukarno

Notes

References
Catholic Encyclopaedia (passim)
1911 Encyclopædia Britannica (passim)
EtymologyOnLine
African American Orators: A Bio-Critical Sourcebook, edited by Richard W. Leeman, Greenwood Publishing Group, 1996. 
The Will of a People:  A Critical Anthology of Great Speeches by African Americans, edited with critical introductions by Richard W. Leeman and Bernard K. Duffy, Southern Illinois University Press, 2012.  |  
American Orators of the Twentieth Century:  Critical Studies and Sources, edited by Bernard K. Duffy and Halford R. Ryan, Greenwood, 1987.   
American Orators Before 1900:  Critical Studies and Sources, edited by Bernard K. Duffy and Halford R. Ryan, Greenwood, 1987.   
American Voices:  An Encyclopedia of Contemporary Orators, edited by Bernard K. Duffy and Richard W. Leeman, Greewnood, 1987.    
Women Public Speakers in the United States, 1800–1925: A Bio-Critical Sourcebook, edited by Karlyn Kohrs Campbell,  Greenwood, 1993.    
American Voices, Significant Speeches in American History: 1640–1945, edited by James Andrews and David Zarefsky, Longman Publishing Group, 1989.   
Contemporary American Voices: Significant Speeches in American History, 1945–Present, edited by James R. Andrews and David Zarefsky, Longman Publishing Group, 1991.     
Contemporary American Public Discourse. 3rd Edition. edited by Halford Ross Ryan, Waveland Press, 1991.    |

External links

Voices of Democracy
American Rhetoric

Public speaking
List of orators

it:Oratoria
hu:Szónoki beszéd